Tano Road is an unincorporated community and census-designated place (CDP) in Santa Fe County, New Mexico, United States. It was first listed as a CDP prior to the 2020 census.

The CDP is in northern Santa Fe County and is bordered to the south and east by the city of Santa Fe, the state capital, to the southwest by Tres Arroyos and Las Campanas, and to the northwest by La Tierra.

Demographics

Education
Almost all of Tano Road is within Santa Fe Public Schools. A small portion is in Pojoaque Valley Public Schools. Pojoaque Valley High School is the zoned school for Pojoaque Valley.

References 

Census-designated places in Santa Fe County, New Mexico
Census-designated places in New Mexico